Marzia is a given name. People with this name include:

Marzia Basel (born 1968), Afghan judge
Marzia Caravelli (born 1981), Italian athlete 
Marzia Gazzetta (born 1967), Italian athlete
Marzia Kjellberg (née Bisognin, born 1992), Italian internet personality, entrepreneur, and actress
Marzia Piazza (born 1951), Venezuelan beauty pageant queen
Marzia Stano, Italian singer 
Marzia Tedeschi (born 1976), Italian actress

See also 
Marzia (disambiguation)
Marcia (given name)
Marziale
Marzian, Lorestan